Joseph "Joe" Anthony Antic (13 March 1931 – 12 July 2016) was an Indian field hockey player. He was born in Secunderabad. He won a silver medal at the 1960 Summer Olympics in Rome.

References

External links
 

1931 births
2016 deaths
People from Secunderabad
Field hockey players from Telangana
Asian Games medalists in field hockey
Field hockey players at the 1960 Summer Olympics
Field hockey players at the 1962 Asian Games
Indian male field hockey players
Medalists at the 1960 Summer Olympics
Olympic field hockey players of India
Olympic medalists in field hockey
Olympic silver medalists for India
Asian Games silver medalists for India
Medalists at the 1962 Asian Games